Mow may refer to:

 Mow (surname)
 Mow, Gaya, Bihar, India
 A hayloft
 English onomatopaeia for the calling sound a cat makes

See also
 MOW (disambiguation)
 Mowing
 Mo (disambiguation)
 Meaux (disambiguation)
 mho
 Mohs (disambiguation)
 Men of war (disambiguation)